The 2020 Richmond Spiders football team represented the University of Richmond in the 2020–21 NCAA Division I FCS football season. They were led by fourth-year head coach Russ Huesman and played their home games at E. Claiborne Robins Stadium. The Spiders competed as a member of the Colonial Athletic Association.

On July 17, 2020, the Colonial Athletic Association announced that it would not play fall sports due to the COVID-19 pandemic. However, the conference did allow the option for teams to play as independents for the 2020 season if they still wished to play in the fall.

Previous season

The Spiders finished the 2019 season 5–7, 4–4 in CAA play to finish in a four-way tie for fifth place.

Schedule
Richmond had a game scheduled against Yale on October 17, which was later canceled before the start of the 2020 season. The CAA released its spring conference schedule on October 27, 2020.

References

Richmond
Richmond Spiders football seasons
Richmond Spiders football
Richmond Spiders football